Jamberoo Action Park is a seasonal water theme park, which operates between September and April inclusive. Outside those times, the office remains open and staff are always available to field all types of bookings or enquiries. Jamberoo Action Park is NSW's largest family owned and operated water park and is situated at Jamberoo, New South Wales. It is approximately 34 km from Nowra, 15 minutes from Kiama, 30 minutes south of Wollongong and a little over an hour south of Sydney. It contains such rides as: The Perfect Storm, Funnel Web, The Taipan, The Rock and more. Jamberoo Action Park is set to introduce Australia's newest, biggest and best water thrill ride precinct "Velocity Falls" in September 2022 and has plans to continue the evolution of the park for many years to come.

Gallery

See also
Action Park

References

https://www.jamberoo.net/about/about-us/
Water parks in New South Wales
Wollongong
1980 establishments in Australia
Articles containing video clips